Lire (literally, to read) is a French literary magazine covering both French and foreign literature. The magazine was founded in 1975 by Jean-Louis Servan-Schreiber and Bernard Pivot. It was owned by the Roularta Media Group until January 2015 when it was acquired by French businessman Patrick Drahi. In 2016, Drahi sold his magazines to SFR. In 2017, Lire was acquired by Jean-Jacques Augier and Stéphane Chabenat.

References

External links
Lire home page (in French)

1975 establishments in France
French-language magazines
Literary magazines published in France
Magazines established in 1975
Magazines published in Paris
Monthly magazines published in France